Breathing Happy is an upcoming American drama film written and directed by Shane Brady in his feature directorial debut.

Premise
Dylan is a recovering drug addict about to celebrate his first year of sobriety on Christmas.

Cast
 Shane Brady
 John D'Aquino
 Augie Duke
 June Carryl
 Phil Esposito
 Katelyn Nacon
 Jim O'Heir
 Aaron Moorhead
 Justin Benson
 Sarah Bolger
 Owen Atlas
 Sarah Noelle Eastep

Production
The drama film Breathing Happy was announced on April 16, 2021, when filming began around Tampa, Florida and Los Angeles, California. Due to the COVID-19 pandemic, principal photography was moved from L.A. to Florida, where filming took place mainly in the childhood house of writer and director Shane Brady, located in Palm Harbor, Florida. As a result, various locations in the screenplay were removed and the script was rewritten to model the house.

In creating the film, Brady said that he "didn't want to tell a literal story of addiction, with a logical, linear flow because when it comes to drugs, nothing makes sense." He also described his time as a magician, and how it helped him "tell this story in a way no one else could", and explained that the film was his "artistic interpretation of my family's struggles with addiction" as a "jumbled popcorn machine of emotions and points of view hopefully bringing about healing for other families struggling with addiction."

During post-production, the film score was composed by Christopher Dudley from the American rock band Underoath.

Release
The film is set to premiere at the Chattanooga Film Festival in June 2022.

References

External links
 

American drama films
Films shot in Florida
Films shot in Los Angeles
2022 drama films
2022 films
2020s English-language films
2020s American films